Daudebardia brevipes is a species of air-breathing land snail or semi-slug, a terrestrial pulmonate gastropod mollusk in the family Oxychilidae which belongs to the "Limacoid clade".

Distribution 
The distribution of this species is central-European and southern-European.

It occurs in:
 The Czech Republic
 Slovakia
 Ukraine

References

External links 

Oxychilidae
Gastropods described in 1805